The Kocsonya Festival is an annual event held in the city of Miskolc, Hungary, celebrating the end of the winter season. The event consists of concerts, performances and stores where visitors can buy traditional Hungarian products and fare. The festival is the largest gastronomic event in Hungary, with an overwhelming range of cuisine from Miskolc and across the country.

History of the festival
The festival has been held annually since 1999. Initially part of 'Vendégségben Miskolcon', a project to enhance the attraction of Miskolc with both international and domestic tourists, the festival has since grown to become a large public event in its own right. In 2001 the first 'Kocsonya Ball' was organized, followed in 2002 by the 'Celebration of Kocsonya'. In 2003 the event was extended again by a 'Kocsonya Gala', and since 2004 the program has been known as the 'Miskolc Winter Kocsonya Festival'.

Legend of kocsonya
The proverb "Blinks like frog in the Miskolc kocsonya" dates from the nineteenth century. It is based on a legend which describes a careless waiter who didn't realize that a frog had jumped into the kocsonya, which was then left in a cellar in order to congeal. The waiter then served the meat jelly together with the frog which, the legend says, was still blinking. This gave rise to the expression “blinks like a frog in the Miskolc meat jelly”, referring to a glazed look of dumbfounded surprise. After the incident the story was dispersed in the form of postcards and gifts all over the country.

More information about kocsonya 
Kocsonya is a traditional cold meal which can be found in many European nations' cuisine. The recipe appears in the oldest cookbook, written in France in 1395.

Ingredients of kocsonya 
Kocsonya is a Hungarian meat jelly similar to aspic that is served as a chilled main course. It is traditionally made from pork products such as pig ears, pig tail, pig pettitoes, the front hand of pork, and pork skin. Spices that are added include red pepper, salt, black pepper, garlic, hot red pepper, and onion.

Recipe 
Clean and wash the meat. Put it into cold water and boil it. After boiling it for the first time pour the liquid off, pour fresh water on it and boil again. After that add the spices and the flavorings to it. Boil it slowly until it is ready. Take the big bones out of the meat and then put them into plates. Clean the fat from the surface of the liquid then pour the liquid into the plates onto the meat. After that put the plates to a cold place, let it cool down. Before serving you can put either red pepper or black pepper on the top or you can serve it with lemon also.

See also
 Aspic

Notes

References 

Festivals in Hungary